idealo internet GmbH is a German price comparison service launched in Germany in 2000, and since bought by the Axel Springer AG publishing company. The headquarters are in Berlin, Germany. The idealo website allows users to compare prices on a range of products from hundreds of shops.

The company invested 2011 an undisclosed amount of money in Sparheld International GmbH which operates various coupon portals across Europe, including Sparheld.de in Germany and Reduc.fr in France.

History
The company was founded by Martin Sinner, Albrecht von Sonntag, Christian Habermehl and others in 2000, using €500,000 in venture capital (of which €350,000 from KfW).
In July 2006, Axel Springer bought a 74.9% majority interest in idealo internet GmbH for an undisclosed sum. Its 2012 revenues were €52,612,705.01.

Technology
The idealo sites use a combination of screen scraping retailers' websites and CSV files supplied by the retailers themselves to create a unique database of product offers that is filtered by real people. These prices are matched against a bespoke backend database of products and this matching process is carried out by using a fuzzy logic automated matching system as well as large teams of people also acting as a quality control filter.

Business model

idealo is a consumer review and price comparison website that is similar to other price comparison services in that it is financed by advertisers on traffic quantities as well as quality. Companies advertising their products on idealo track user traffic and clicks through tracking pixels.

Product offers displayed on the idealo website are normally ordered by price where the lowest is shown at the top of any listing, however on product listing pages the products are ordered by price, popularity, user rating or test results. Some other comparison shopping website such as Kelkoo and Shopping.com may feature only paying retailers and allow them to bid for position in the rankings.

Each idealo product page also features a place for product reviews and shows a trend graph of each product costs over time.

In 2019, Idealo stated it struggles to compete with other services like Google Shopping.

Notes

External links
 idealo UK site
 idealo France site
 idealo Spain site
 idealo Italy site

Comparison shopping websites
Review websites